Gross's stinkfish (Callionymus grossi) is a species of dragonet found in the waters off of northwestern Australia.  This species grows to a length of  TL.

References 

G
Fish described in 1910